The École française de Rome (EFR) is a French research institute for history, archaeology, and the social sciences; overseen by the Académie des Inscriptions et Belles-Lettres, and a division of the  Ministère de l'Enseignement supérieur et de la Recherche.

History and description 
The EFR is the successor to the Institut de Correspondance Archéologique, created in 1829 to accommodate researchers from outside Rome. Composed largely of French and German scholars, it was permanently closed as a result of the Franco-Prussian War. In 1873, a branch of the École française d'Athènes was opened there; becoming the EFR in 1875.

It has eighteen students, who are there for three years, recruited from advanced doctoral candidates. It also awards 150 grants each year, to young researchers whose work requires them to be in Italy for one or two months.

The EFR is managed by a Director and is divided into three sections (Antiquity, Middles Ages, Modern Period), each with its own Vice-Director. It has an extensive library, open to members, former members, and accredited researchers. 

The EFR also organizes archaeological excavation sites throughout Italy, North Africa and the Balkans.

Sources 
 Michel Gras & Olivier Poncet (Eds.), Construire l'institution. L'Ecole Française de Rome 1873-1895, EFR, 2013 (Online)
 Jean Bayet (Ed.), L’Histoire et l’œuvre de l’École française de Rome, Paris, E. de Boccard, 1931

External links 

 École française de Rome official website
 Archives de la direction, des directions des études, du service des publications et des services administratifs de l'École française de Rome (1873-2011) @ the Archives Nationales

Research institutes
Archaeology